Man Pangong is a village in the Leh district of the Indian union territory of Ladakh. It is located in the Durbuk tehsil, near the Pangong Tso lake.

Demographics
According to the 2011 census of India, Man Pangong has 171 households. The effective literacy rate (i.e. the literacy rate of population excluding children aged 6 and below) is 69.52%.

References 

Villages in Durbuk tehsil
Pangong Lake